Constitutive coactivator of PPAR-gamma-like protein 1 is a protein that in humans is encoded by the FAM120A gene.

References

Further reading